Nika Radišić (born 19 March 2000) is a Slovenian tennis player.

Radišić has a career-high singles ranking of world No. 416, achieved on 18 July 2022. On 18 October 2021, she peaked at No. 190 in the WTA doubles ranking. Up to date, she has won one singles title and eleven doubles titles on the ITF Circuit.

On the ITF Junior Circuit, she has a career-high combined ranking of 18, achieved on 26 February 2018.

Radišić made her debut for Slovenia Fed Cup team in 2018.

ITF finals

Singles: 2 (1 title, 1 runner–up)

Doubles: 18 (12 titles, 6 runner–ups)

ITF Junior Circuit finals

Singles: 6 (4–2)

Doubles: 11 (5–6)

National representation

Fed Cup
Radišić made her debut for Slovenia Fed Cup team in 2018, while the team was competing in the Europe/Africa Zone Group I.

Fed Cup (1–2)

Singles (0–1)

Doubles (1–1)

* walkover doesn't count in her overall record.

Notes

References

External links
 
 
 
 

2000 births
Living people
Slovenian female tennis players
Sportspeople from Koper